The Allen's swamp monkey (Allenopithecus nigroviridis) is a species of Old World monkey and the only member of the genus Allenopithecus. Phylogenetically, it is a sister clade to the guenons, but differs in dentition and habits.

Allen's swamp monkey was named after American zoologist Joel Asaph Allen.

Range 
Allen's swamp monkey lives in the Congo Basin, in the Republic of Congo and in the west of the DRC. It was recorded from Dzanga-Sangha Special Reserve in the Central African Republic in 2016.

Description 
This monkey is a rather strongly built animal.  The slight webbing of the fingers and toes point to its partially aquatic way of life. Allen's swamp monkey can reach a full body length from 45 to 60 cm, with a roughly 50-cm-long tail. Males, weighing up to 6 kg, are substantially larger than the females (up to 3.5 kg).

Behavior 

Allen's swamp monkey is a diurnal animal and regularly looks for food on the ground. It inhabits swampy, water-rich areas and can swim well, diving to avoid danger. It lives in social groups of up to 40 animals, communicating with different calls, gestures, and touches.

Its diet consists of fruits and leaves, as well as beetles and worms.

Little is known of the mating habits of this species. The females bear young, which are weaned around three months old and are mature after three to five years. Its lifespan can be as long as 23 years. Raptors, snakes, and the bonobo are the natural predators of Allen's swamp monkey. It is also hunted for its meat.

References

External links
 
 
 Primate Info Net Allenopithecus Factsheets

Allen's swamp monkey
Fauna of Central Africa
Mammals of Cameroon
Mammals of the Democratic Republic of the Congo
Mammals of the Republic of the Congo
Allen's swamp monkey
Taxa named by R. I. Pocock